James Edward Hartigan (born in Carshalton, South London) is an English journalist and broadcaster who is best known as a poker commentator on British and American television, and as a presenter and film critic on London talk radio station LBC.

Background
Hartigan grew up in Sutton, South London and Banstead, Surrey. He went to university at Christ Church College Canterbury, graduating in 1996 with a BA in Radio, Film and Television and English Literature.

Radio
Hartigan began his broadcasting career as a film critic at BBC Radio Kent and journalist at County Sound Radio before joining London’s Heart 106.2 in 1998 as the news anchor on Jono Coleman’s Breakfast Show.  In addition, he was the station’s Showbiz Editor.

In 2001, he was hired by UBC Media to run commercial programming, including its syndicated entertainment news service.  He returned to live broadcasting in 2004, reading news bulletins on Jazz FM and Classic FM (UK), and presenting a variety of programmes on LBC, including news magazine The Morning Report on LBC News 1152 and the weekday Drivetime show on LBC 97.3.

Since November 2008, Hartigan has been LBC's film critic.

Poker
Hartigan has been a recreational poker player since the early 1990s.  In 2005, as a professional broadcaster with a keen interest in the game, he was hired by The Poker Channel to commentate on the World Cup of Poker and the World Speed Poker Open.  He has since commentated on tournaments across Europe and has presented poker programmes for Channel 4, Sky Sports, Eurosport and Challenge.

He currently works on the European Poker Tour and PokerStars Caribbean Adventure, as the main host of the television highlights shows and EPT Live webcasts.  He played in the Deauville EPT in season one. Hartigan has also fronted coverage of the North American Poker Tour and World Series of Poker for ESPN, including the 2010 WSOP Main Event Final Table, and is one of the faces of Sky Poker, appearing on the channel as a presenter and analyst. He also writes an occasional blog for the Sky Poker website.

Awards
Along with fellow poker commentator Joe Stapleton (poker), Hartigan was the recipient of the, 'Best Podcast' award at the 2022 Globe Poker Awards, for their show "Poker in the Ears".

Personal
Hartigan lives in Putney, South West London. As well as poker and movies, he is a fan of tennis and NFL. He has followed the San Francisco 49ers since they won Super Bowl XIX.

References

External links 
lbc.co.uk

English male journalists
English film critics
Poker commentators
People educated at Sutton Grammar School
1975 births
Living people
English male non-fiction writers